The 5th Hollywood Critics Association Film Awards, presented by the Hollywood Critics Association, took place on February 28, 2022 in Avalon Hollywood. It was originally scheduled to take place on January 8, 2022, but was postponed due to the rising number of COVID-19 cases linked to the Omicron variant. The ceremony was hosted by Annaleigh Ashford.

The nominations were announced on December 2, 2021. Dune received the most nominations with ten, followed by Belfast and CODA with nine each. In regards to the total number of overall nominations for studios, Netflix led with 27, followed by Warner Bros. with 18 and Focus Features with 17.

Winners and nominees
Winners are listed first and highlighted with boldface.

Special Honorary awards
 Newcomer Award – Jude Hill
 Inspire Award – Aunjanue Ellis
 Game Changer Award – Simu Liu
 Spotlight Award – The Cast of CODA
 Star on the Rise Award – Saniyya Sidney
 International Icon Award – Javier Bardem
 Artisan on the Rise Award – Alice Brooks
 Acting Achievement Award – Nicolas Cage
 Artisans Achievement Award – Greig Fraser
 Filmmaker on the Rise Award – Natalie Morales
 Excellence in Artistry Award – Kenneth Branagh
 Filmmaking Achievement Award – Guillermo del Toro

Films with multiple wins
The following films received multiple awards:

Films with multiple nominations
The following films received multiple nominations:

See also
 4th Hollywood Critics Association Midseason Film Awards
 1st Hollywood Critics Association TV Awards

References

External links
 

Film Awards 05
2021 film awards
2022 in Los Angeles
2021 in American cinema
2022 awards in the United States
Events postponed due to the COVID-19 pandemic